The European Parliament election of 2009 took place on 6–7 June 2009. The Aosta Valley coalition, hegemonized by the Valdostan Union, was the most voted in Aosta Valley with 37.1%, but received no seats, while Autonomy Liberty Democracy came distant second (18.5%).

Results
{| class="wikitable" style="font-size:95%"
|- bgcolor="EFEFEF"
! Party
! votes
! votes (%)
|-
| Aosta Valley coalition
| align=right|20,686
| align=right|37.1
|-
| Autonomy Liberty Democracy
| align=right|10,320
| align=right|18.5
|-
| The People of Freedom
| align=right|8,103
| align=right|14.3
|-
| Democratic Party
| align=right|7,161
| align=right|12.8
|-
| Lega Nord
| align=right|2,445
| align=right|4.4
|-
| Italy of Values
| align=right|2,297	
| align=right|4.1
|-
| Anticapitalist List (PRC–PdCI)
| align=right|1,270
| align=right|2.3
|-
| Bonino-Pannella List
| align=right|1,109
| align=right|2.0
|-
| Union of the Centre
| align=right|1,093
| align=right|2.0
|-
| Others
| align=right|979
| align=right|2.3
|-
|- bgcolor="EFEFEF"
| Total
| align=right|55,759
| align=right|100.0
|-
|}
Source: Ministry of the Interior

2009 elections in Italy
Elections in Aosta Valley
European Parliament elections in Italy
2009 European Parliament election